The Audie Award for Audio Drama is one of the Audie Awards presented annually by the Audio Publishers Association (APA). It awards excellence in performance, production, and content for an audiodrama released in a given year. Originally the award was given as the Audie Award for Theatrical Production in 1999; in 2000 and 2001 the award was given as the Audie Award for Theatrical Performance. The award was not given in 2002.

Winners and finalists

1990s

2000s

2010s

2020s

References

External links 

 Audie Award winners
 Audie Awards official website

Audio Drama
English-language literary awards
Awards established in 1999